Hart Pease Danks (6 April 1834 – 20 November 1903) was an American musician who specialized in composing, singing and leading choral groups. He is best known for his 1873 composition, Silver Threads Among the Gold.

Biography

Born in New Haven, Connecticut, Danks moved with his family to Saratoga Springs, New York when he was eight. He studied music with Dr. E. Whiting, later moving to Chicago, where he worked as a carpenter in his father's construction business before embarking on a full-time music career.

In 1858, he married Hattie R. Colahan.  In 1864, he moved to New York City. In 1873, he published his best known song, "Silver Threads Among the Gold" (words by Eben E. Rexford), which sold over three million copies. Having sold the rights to it, though, he died penniless in a boarding house in Philadelphia, his last written words: "It’s hard to die alone". His widow died, alone, in 1924. Danks is buried at Kensico Cemetery, in Valhalla, New York.

Pease Danks was inducted into the Songwriters Hall of Fame in 1970. He wrote over 1,000 songs.

His works also include several operettas, including Zanie (published 1887, to a libretto by Fanny Crosby) and Pauline, or the Belle of Saratoga (ca.1874).

Other collaborators and contributions.
Other lyricists who Danks worked with included Samuel N. Mitchell and Fanny Crosby.
In 1892, he published Superior Anthems for Church Choirs, and himself wrote numerous church hymns.

References

External links
 
 

1834 births
1903 deaths
American male composers
American composers
Songwriters from Connecticut
Musicians from New Haven, Connecticut
People from Saratoga Springs, New York
Burials at Kensico Cemetery
Songwriters from New York (state)
19th-century American male musicians
American male songwriters